Olivia Marie Tracey (born 11 July 1960) is an Irish model and actress.

Biography
Born Olivia Treacy in Terenure, Dublin, she attended Loreto Beaufort and University College, Dublin. She qualified as a teacher but soon took up modelling. She won Miss Ireland in 1984, and finished in the top 10 in both the Miss World contest in 1984, and the Miss Universe contest in 1985. She subsequently worked as an actress on both stage and screen, with minor roles in Agnes Browne (1999), The Island (2005) and Lucky You (2007), and a starring role in Red Roses and Petrol (2002). As of 2019, she is a model and actress living in Los Angeles.

References

External links

Living people
Actresses from County Dublin
1960 births
20th-century Irish actresses
21st-century Irish actresses
Irish actresses
Irish emigrants to the United States
Irish female models
Actors from County Meath
Miss Universe 1985 contestants
Miss World 1984 delegates
Miss Ireland winners
Beauty pageant contestants from Ireland